The international system is for the most part made up by small powers or small states. While a small power in the international system may never equal or surpass the effect of larger powers, they can nevertheless influence the workings of the international system together with others. The formalization of the division between small and great powers came about with the signing of the Treaty of Chaumont in 1814. Before that the assumption had been that all independent states were in theory equal regardless of actual strength and responsibilities.

According to a 2017 review study, "What scholars can agree on is that small states generally prefer multilateralism as both a path to influence and a means to restrain larger states. Studies of influential small states indicate that they are able to develop issue-specific power to make up for what they lack in aggregate structural power. Small states can, therefore, develop power disproportionate relative to their size on the few issues of utmost importance to them. In addition to prioritization, small states have successfully employed the strategies of coalition-building and image-building. Even though small state administrations lack the resources of their larger counterparts, their informality, flexibility, and the autonomy of their diplomats can prove advantageous in negotiations and within institutional settings."
Types of countries

Powers great and small 
Almost all studies of power in international relations focus on great power politics and it will for this reason not be discussed here. For, as László Réczei noted, power status hinges on the capacity for violence: "If the notion of war were unknown in international relations, the definition of ‘small power’ would have no significance; just as in the domestic life of a nation it has no significance whether a man is less tall or has a weaker physique than his fellow citizen."

Most of the small-state studies that make up the backbone of the small power research tradition were carried out in the heyday of non-alignment by scholars such as David Vital, Robert Rothstein, Maurice East and Robert Keohane.

The weakening of the non-alignment movement during the 1970s coincided with a gradual decline in small-state studies, culminating in Peter Baehr's critical appraisal of the research tradition in which he questioned smallness as a useful framework for analysis. The small-power category was first taken into serious account with David Mitrany's study on world government (pax oecumenica) in 1933. Mitrany argued that the international community consisted only of two tiers of state powers: great and small.

Asle Toje takes a view where great powers and small powers distinguish themselves through patterns of behaviour. Small powers are not down scaled great powers – or oversized microstates.

Alesina and Spolaore presented that the benefits of being a large state included (but were not limited too) being less economically vulnerable, militarily powerful, cheaper public goods, greater administrative strength and greater diplomatic power. Small countries can enter into military alliances, but, in general, size determines the extent of military power. It makes sense that a small state foreign policy would be formed to overcome the lack of capabilities the states battle within these areas. Take for example economic power where larger states can transfer money from boom regions to bust regions which most small states can't, which makes them more vulnerable to temporary volatility and economic fluctuation. Alesina and Spolaore state that if there were only benefits from size, then the tendency should be for the entire world to be organized in a single country. They argue that the number of states in the international system is likely to increase. They name a few reasons.  Firstly, it is democratization. Dictators prefer large states so that they can extract greater rents. More democracies lead to more states. Peacefulness is also a reason.  Small states can more easily survive and be stable in a peaceful world. Free trade and international economic integration also plays a big role. Small states gain access to the markets that they depend on so more free trade and economic integration -leads to more states. The presence of international institutions to coordinate political and economic policies also plays a role as well as more comprehensive international law and better defined property rights.

Defining small powers 
There is no one definition of small powers. Therefore, they have been defined in various ways. As Thorhallsson and Steinsson point out, shortage of the resources and capabilities that determine power and influence are central to most definitions of small powers. The most common factor for defining state size, however, they continue is population size. Besides the size of population, other variables such as territory, economy, and military capabilities are also used.

Even though the most common factor for defining small powers is the size of the population, there is not an agreement of how populous states should be to be defined as small or middle powers. Although states with less than 10 or 15 million inhabitants are regarded as small by most academics, states with up to 30 million inhabitants are sometimes considered small. Others, however, think of size as a relative concept where the influence of great powers is seen as far greater and the influence of middle powers moderately greater than those of small powers. Additionally, small states barely have the capabilities to influence the international system.

It is quite clear that this “smallness” is not systematic, but as Long among others states, reduced size really depends on context. The concept of state as well as that of power are therefore not consequential to just one factor, but to many such as markers of population, GDP, or military indicators. To find a balanced conclusion, we need to discern quantitative and qualitative approaches to analyze and define a small state. As a matter of fact, smallness and greatness can evolve in time and as Vital points out all states possess aspects of strength and weakness. In a realistic approach to small states theory we could observe how small powers are mostly defined by their actual lack of power, which is of course not the case. They are for instance quite relevant in the IR area, both to the political and social aspect. This could be, according to Chong and Maass (2010) an indicator of power, more precisely "foreign policy power".

For example, Thorhallsson proposes a framework that intertwines multiple factors. In that regard, factors such as fixed size (population and territory), sovereignty size (the degree to which a state controls its internal affairs and borders and is recognized), political size (military and administrative capabilities, domestic cohesion, and foreign policy consensus), economic size (GDP, market size, and development), perceptual size (how a state is perceived by internal or external actors), and preference size (the ideas, ambitions, and priorities of domestic elites regarding their role in the international system) are given equal value as opposed to just a single factor.

The size of small states

Optimal size of states 
The size of small states is affected by several variables. These tend to result in a balance between the diversity of the population and the benefits of a larger state.

The costs of the diversity within the population occurs from different needs and preferences within the population. These include:
 Non-economic factors (culture, religion, language)
 Economic factors (income and industrialization patterns)

A benefit of a larger state is a larger market and more efficient provision of public goods. States can also grow to create larger internal markets to internalize the benefits of free trade opportunities. In a free trade regime, states can remain smaller. Historically times of war have led to state consolidation due to the cost and benefits of a centralized military. Larger states tend to correlate with stronger central governments while democratization tends to generate smaller states.

Early history of small states in Europe 
From the 14th to 17th century European city-states were unified around politics and economics and had many of the characteristics of modern small, democratic countries.

Industrialization and a search for larger markets and inter-regional trade led to regional consolidation. Professionalization of the European military and innovation in military technology increased the financial cost of wars. This increased the benefits and power of a larger state. Outside of Europe empires (China, the Ottoman Empire and India) tended to expand with the incentive to tax and support the elite. However, history has demonstrated that expansion often was the downfall of empires and that there was a more optimal size for states.

The inherent geographical constraint on England is partially credited with the effective development of a sustainable state in the late 16th and 17th centuries, rather than a conquest driven effort of territorial acquisition.

Evaluating the size of a state 
To answer the question of what constitutes a small state, many different criteria must be regarded. Many factors, both subjective and objective, can contribute to what is perceived as the size of a state, so there is no one entirely fulfilling definition. No matter how diverse criteria are used to define the size of states, no one method will suffice to group the states of the world today because of their diversity. For example, the easiest and most often used indicators of the size of a state, population and geographical area, already pose a problem if the world's states are to be grouped in two: small or large. In that case, extremely different countries like San Marino and Sweden on one hand and Italy and China on the other would get grouped together.

In their article Introduction: Small states and the European Union Clive Archer and Neill Nugent mention Raimo Väyrynen's definition of the axes along which the properties of small states had been measured in international relations literature by the time of Väyrynen's survey's publication in 1971. Although not perfect, it remains useful now despite its age, to capture the different approaches used when small states are identified:

"One axis considers whether the factors involved are endogenous or exogenous: that is to say, whether the smallness lies in the internal aspects of a country itself (such as its population or Gross Domestic Product [GDP]) or in its relations with other states (such as the size of its armed forces or its alliance status). The other axis involves objective and subjective evaluations: that is, whether the smallness is seen in terms of ‘measureable’ elements (such as geographical area or size of the diplomatic corps) or ‘impressionistic’ elements (notably views held and/or expressed by practitioners and commentators either at home or abroad)."

In the same paper, they mention the difficulty of categorizing a state as a small state based only on its size. They argue how the population size can determine the decision if a small state is considered small, but the actual parameters used for that approach can be rather complicated. They go on to explain how a state that has a population below one million falls into the category of a micro-state, but a state with a population over ten million would be better described as a medium-sized state. Also, that number is not necessarily the only one used for the measurement, mostly because of the similar sizes of some states. They use the examples of Central European states such as the Czech Republic and Hungary and the Benelux states, the original ten million margin would more logically be moved to twelve, so that it could include these countries on the small state spectrum. The exploration of these parameters is a big part of the small state debate, especially in Europe. The authors also mention the big difference between European, and for example Latin American or African countries. The states in Latin America unquestionably have larger populations, but that still does not really affect their placement in the category of small states, because their weakness in the international system is still noticeable and influences the way the states are seen as “small”. This is an important approach, since it makes it clear how aside from the geographical and population size, the country's GDP, the ranking of a state in the international system, the political, economical and military power play an important role in putting a state somewhere on the spectrum.

Foreign policy of small states 
Small states are usually more vulnerable to changes in the international system since they are more focused on survival than the bigger states. The costs of being exploited are way higher for small states and the effects of foreign-policy mistakes are much bigger, since the bigger states have a larger margin of time and error. So in some ways statesmen in small states have to watch more closely for external constraints. Using that reasoning, IR-theorists tend to believe that the foreign-policy of small states is more greatly influenced by the international system rather than their domestic politics.

Miriam Fendius Elman talks about this in her article The foreign policies of small states: challenging neorealism in its own backyard, adding that foreign policy of bigger states tends to be more influenced by their domestic politics:

"By contrast, domestic politics will necessarily play a greater role in an explanation of great power foreign policy. Generally speaking, great powers are faced with a lower level of external threat in comparison to small states and thus have more options for action. This increased range of choice will tend to make foreign policy formation more susceptible to domestic political influences. Consequently, unit level variables cannot be ignored when explaining great power foreign policy."

She continues to quote Snyder where he points out the importance of the size of state when its foreign policy is being analysed:

"Similarly, Snyder assumes that the study of small state and great power behaviour require different analytical foci. He points out that 'among the great powers, domestic pressures often outweigh international ones in the calculations of national leaders'.'1 Since great powers 'enjoy a substantial buffer from the pressures of international competition', domestic political explanations are good predictors of their foreign policy strategies. When studying the foreign policies of small states, Snyder does not expect domestic political theories to fit as well. Whereas 'great powers adapt their foreign strategies to their domestic circumstances', small states are more 'exposed to the vagaries of international security and economic competition'. Since small state foreign policy strategies will reflect an attentiveness to external exigencies, international/structural explanations should suffice."

More and more research is being done specifically on small states, how they develop their foreign policy, and how they are at some level completely different from larger states. Authors Alyson J.K. Bailes, Bradley A. Thayer, and Baldur Thorhallsson make the argument that small states differ from larger states in how they form alliances in their article Alliance theory and alliance 'Shelter': the complexities of small state alliance behavior. They acknowledge that small states are naturally more vulnerable than larger states, due to smaller militaries, economies, and overall population size. However, they also argue that small states are not without power, especially when viewed through the theory of alliance of shelter.

In comparison with the more traditional international relations view that small states will always be obligated to seek protection from more powerful neighboring states and form alliances with them, the theory of alliance of shelter expands on and differs from this claim and viewpoint in six key ways.
 Shelter theory recognizes that small states are 'fundamentally different' from large states and therefore must act and make decisions using different logic.
 The alliances that small states form reflect not only the international reasons why the alliance is necessary, but the domestic reasons as well.
 Small states are able to benefit from alliances with larger states and reap greater relative gains than the larger state.
 In order to survive and thrive, small states rely heavily on alliance of shelter theory.
 Alliance of shelter theory allows small states to avoid isolation with the outside world using their alliances, which can have a profound social and cultural impact on the small state.
 Due to these alliances, small states may undergo a transformation, both internationally and domestically, which can come at a high cost to the small state.
Baldur Thorhallsson and Alyson J. K. Bailes take the shelter theory even further and talk about how small states have three vulnerabilities, political, economic and societal.
 Political shelter is all about power, be it military or diplomatic. When a state does not have the sources to defend itself, it means that it lacks hard power, for example military, and diplomatic power which means poor administrative capacity. Therefore, is it essential for the small states to "be sheltered by the norms and rules of the international system."
 Economic shelter is very important for small states, it means having economic assistance, access to a common market and even beneficial loans amongst other factors, and it can be from an organisation or another state. In fact, "small domestic markets and concentrated production make small states acutely dependent on international trade."
 Societal shelter is about identity and being recognised by others. Unfortunately, "small states risk cultural, educational and technological stagnation without the free flow of people, goods and ideas." That is why it is not only important but necessary for small states to rely on others in order to prevent stagnation.
It needs to be taken into account that these vulnerabilities come with a cost if small states look towards shelter by either organisations or larger states. The agreements small states have to make need to be beneficial for both them and the state providing the shelter, although the costs may differ between states. It is not always easy for the small states to negotiate on beneficial terms because "shelter providers may impose conditions on smaller states in exchange for the shelter, reducing the small partner's freedom of manoeuvre and choice." In Europe there are various important and inexpensive shelters available for small states.

Power maximization in international negotiations 
A traditional, realist view of small states is that they are disadvantaged within the international system. A Liberal Institutionalist view emphasizes the institutionalization of the international system through international cooperation.

According to Diana Panke, small states can be strategically benefited by a multilateral institutionalized environment.
 When decisions are taken according to a one-state, one-vote, majority voting procedure – such as the WTO and the UN – small states are at the advantage.
 When decisions are taken according to a weighted voting system – such as the EU – small states are disproportionately weakened.

Small states have less representational ability to engage with each international agenda item.

Influential techniques used by small states 
 Maximize influence through strategic priorities, e.g., climate change, equality
 Chair meetings
 Agenda setting
 Individual or collective persuasion strategies

Small states are at a disadvantage in the UN Security Council (UNSC) due to economic, administrative and military weaknesses. According to Baldur Thorhallsson these weaknesses are related to small territories, small economies and small populations.

A Realist perspective takes little notice of small states. It focuses on hard power - military and economic resources. According to Realism small states will always be weak in negotiations. Small states are not powerful according to traditional measures of power and are primarily ignored or disregarded by larger powers.

Liberal Institutionalism sees small states as actors with great potential. A lack of influence is only evidence of a lack of cooperation - or collective action problems. International institutions can decrease the price of cooperation, facilitate information sharing and provide a venue for relationship building.

Unique Powers of Small States 
 Norm entrepreneurship - develop and promote ‘new’ ideas such as equality and sustainable development
 Issue specific power - e.g. fisheries, oil production
 Diplomats are more flexible, autonomous, and directly influential in domestic government.
 Less bureaucratic and therefore potentially faster acting.
 More focused interests and therefore able to form coalitions and trade votes.

Characteristics of small powers
Though a single definition has proved elusive due to the number of potential variables and their particular interpretation under given conditions, Asle Toje claims to have found recurring traits in the research literature regarding the behavioural patterns of small powers on the international stage:

 The strategic behaviour of small powers is characterized by dependence. A small power recognizes that it cannot obtain security by relying solely on its own capabilities.  They cannot affect the international system alone but with some concerted effort they can affect the way the system works.  A small power plays a dispensable and non-decisive part in a great power's array of political and military resources. Small powers therefore tend towards a policy of either strict neutrality or alliance.  Those ‘located in geopolitical regions critical to maintaining a great power's position in the international system [tend] to opt for alliance’.  In an alliance, small powers tend to follow the alliance leader closely, lend it what support they can and avoid antagonizing it.  Under regional hegemony with a low probability of punishment, small powers tend to adopt neutrality.
 Small powers display variable geometry. In terms of military capabilities there is no ability to project power on a global scale. They are forced by their limited resources, their location and by the international system itself to establish clear priorities.  To this end, they identify a hierarchy of risks and attempt to internationalize those considered to be most serious.  Small power policies, argues David Vital, are aimed at altering the external environment by ‘reducing an unfavourable discrepancy in strength, broadening the field of manoeuvre and choice, and increasing the total resources on which the state can count in times of stress’.  Small powers are therefore status quo oriented. They work within the established order rather than attempting to revise the order itself.
 Small powers are the primary beneficiaries of international institutions and are, by necessity, lovers of the law.  A small power will often seek to minimize the costs of conducting foreign policy and will increase the weight behind its policies by engaging in concerted efforts with other actors. Generally, this leads to a high degree of participation in and support for international organizations, which leads to a tendency to adopt ‘moral’ or ‘normative’ policy positions.  Formal rules are actively encouraged in order to curb the great powers and strengthen their own position.
 Small powers are risk averse. They see more dangers than opportunities in international politics, which leads them both to shun system-upholding tasks and to display a penchant for token participation in such endeavours. Zaki Laidi defines a risk averse power as an international actor that ‘defines and responds to the political states of a given identified risk in terms of a will to reduce its uncertainties and uncontrollable effects’.  Due to the risks of extermination when challenging more powerful states, their ambitions are generally ‘defensive’.  They have a narrow range of interests and little freedom of activity. Annette Baker Fox sees small powers as being geographically bound in the sense that their demands are restricted to their own and immediately adjacent areas, while great powers exert their influence on a global scale.  Subsequently, small power strategic behaviour is characterized by a general reluctance to coerce and a tendency to promote multilateral, non-military solutions to security challenges.”

Small powers in international organizations 
Small states can under some circumstances have a disproportionately great influence. According to Diana Panke, "Small states tend to be most likely to punch above their weight if the negotiations take place in an institutionalised arena with majority-based decision-making rules in which each state has one vote or in contexts in which decisions are made unanimously, if they are selective in negotiations and concentrate their capacities on the most important issues, engage in capacity-building activities to maximise their ideational resources, if they make use of institutional opportunity structures such as chairing meetings and engaging in agenda-setting, and if they individually or collectively apply persuasion strategies from early on".

The majority of the states in the world can be considered small states, but somehow there is less than ideal information about the activities of small states within international organisations particularly when it comes to influencing policy outcomes.

Small states encounter size-related obstacles in different negotiation settings (the negotiation settings ranging between everything from the UN and the EU to the WTO) as well as in capacity-building and shaping strategies used to influence negotiation outcomes.

A size-related obstacle would for example be the EU which uses a system of weighted voting, which gives bigger states a greater political leverage than smaller states. On the other hand, a lot of International Organisations use a "one state, one vote" principle which may appear to secure equality between states of various sizes. However, even if the formal voting itself is equal what happens in the background is not. Small states face size-related difficulties during negotiation processes in IO's such as the UN because they often possess fewer administrative, financial and economic resources, which hinders them in participating in the negotiation process at the same level as the larger states. They are simply spread too thin across various issues and therefore resort to concentrating all their resources towards the issue of highest significance. Therefore, small states are forced to choose between their interests in negotiations. They also produce better results if they use persuasion based strategies rather than bargaining ones because they lack bargaining leverage.

In addition, delegates from smaller states tend to have speaking points for fewer issues and smaller budgets than the delegates from the larger nations; This gives the larger states a better position to influence outcomes both in weighted and equal weight voting systems.

There are a number of ways that small states can try to counter size-related obstacles. Small states can engage in capacity-building, for example through contacts with or through joining coalitions. Capacity building can increase a state's ideational capacities and amplify the effectiveness of persuasion-based strategies. Coalitions have burden-sharing effects and can increase the discursive leverage of its members

Secondly small states can also use shaping strategies. Shaping strategies can include either legal, moral or normative argumentation applied in different negotiation settings. Framing and reframing is for example important for small states if there is a high number of delegations participating in the negotiations.

These strategies help small states compete, but they are not always enough for them to compete successfully.

The location of a small power can be very important for its survival. If a small power is working as a so call "buffer state" between two bigger rival power then it is more likely for that state to cease to exist. Despite the fact that the buffer location can decrease the likelihood of a small powers survival does not mean that a state cannot use its buffer location as an advantage. In the cod wars (a fishing dispute over a 20-year period between Iceland and the UK) the micro nation of Iceland was able to use both its small size and location as an advantage and won the conflict. One of the reasons is the threat by Icelandic authorities to leave NATO and remove the US defence force out of the country. It seems that the UK were not willing to go as far as the Icelandic government to win the dispute even though they had the military power to do so. According to Sverrir Steinsson, it seems that the simple liberal explanation is not enough on its own to explain the difference between the nations in a satisfactory way. Even though many Icelandic officials did not want to leave NATO over the fishing dispute, they had enormous pressure from the public to do so if the dispute would not end, while the UK had much less public pressure over the issue. According to Steinsson's result it seems that small powers are much more affected by domestic view than bigger powers which can increase the chances of a small state leaving an international organisation.

Small states' power 
Small states' power can be categorized as particular-intrinsic, derivative and collective. Through one of these three types of power can small states best seek their needs and interest. Middle or great powers are not precluded from these types of power, only the limitations of the small states force them to rely on them more. Small states have different goals and different bases, i.e., ideational, material and relational bases. Bases are the resources that a state has and can exploit in order to effect another's behavior. This variation of small states' bases lead to a variety of means of power. Means in this context are the ways a state utilizes its base. The three categories of power all have different bases and therefore different means, best understood as small states' properties and its actions.

Particular-intrinsic power 
Small states lack many of the factors that usually determine capability. Some may however possess a particular form of intrinsic power. Particular-intrinsic resources can serve as the base of small states' power but the resources will only gain importance through the states actions. For example, small states may rely on their strategic location or material possessions. Identity can also be a potential base for the exercise of power.

Derivative power 
Small states that lack material capabilities can try to persuade larger states to take actions that will increase their interests and thus derive power. In this category of power the base is the relationship between the great power and the small state. The means of this power will depend on the small states’ goals and the type of relationship it has with the larger state. In a friendly relationship, for example, there can be the possibility for an access to policy discourses.

Collective power 
The base of collective power is the relationship a small state has to other small states. This type of power can be achieved through single-issue groupings, institutionalism or by leveraging allies in pursuance of one state's cause.  Furthermore, collective power can be either institutional or compulsory. A collective power is compulsory when a large state is directly pressured by small states to change its policies through promises or threats. Institutions can provide small states with protection and a voice. They can provide the ability for small states to influence rules and be used to broaden norms in the international field. International organizations are particularly useful for small states in terms of norm promoting activities.

The effect of industrial sectors on small (Nordic) states' behavior 
Small states are more dependent on their leading economic sector more than larger states. The Nordic states of Denmark, Sweden and Finland have sought shelter in the European Union while the remaining others, Iceland and Norway, do not. The five Nordic states have differences that are important to their industrial structures as Lars Mjoset, a Norwegian political economist, pointed out.

Ingebritsen noted that: Each Nordic government had to respond to a different set of interest groups – some that anticipated positive benefits of European integration and others that anticipated undesirable costs. One of the major differences is how dependant nations are on their raw materials and manufacturing production.

For example, Iceland is a nation that is heavily dependent on fishing as its main export and therefore seeks to protect its fisheries. If Iceland would join the EU it would have to share the market as well as its fishing grounds with for example Spain and Portugal. In Iceland, fishing is a strategic sector: the interests of fishermen are synonymous with government policy goals. Icelanders are uncompromising when it comes to fish’ (ibid, p. 127). This can be seen in more recent events when the Icelandic government put membership to the EU to a national vote following the financial crisis, in which the Icelandic people voted ‘no’ – the fisheries being the too great of a risk factor following membership (ibid).

However, Norway is in a much stronger position in the international community  with less dependency on the ‘internationally oriented manufacturing sector and more reliant on a single industry for its export revenue: the petroleum sector’ (ibid, p. 129). Norwegians hold power with their petroleum sector and have access to important markets for petroleum in Europe without having to join the EU (ibid, p. 130).

Denmark joined the EC in 1973 although with agriculture being the dominant sector at the time, however in recent years manufactured goods have become the largest sector for the Danish national income. (ibid, p. 122).  Danes remained quite supportive and optimistic about the EC with even the support of trade unions: The trade union movement supports the completion of the internal market’; ‘including the removal of the technical and physical barriers to trade, and the liberalization of competition within the EC’ Unlike Iceland, Danish farmers welcomed the competition and access to more markets.

Despite this the Danes have remained active in judging new treaties in the EC/EU and been very observant for national interests, for example by voting no to the Maastricht Treaty on 2 June 1992. However, it did not affect the Danes in the long run, and they did sign the treaty eventually.

Sectoral differences between the Nordic applicants to the EC in the 1970s (Norway and Denmark) can account for the reason why the Danes decided to enter the EC and the Norwegian government failed to achieve a majority in favor of joining the EC.

Sweden was also very pro-EC and joined in 1995. The Swedish industry had been international for a long time but after moving a lot of their operations into the European markets the businesses managed to convince the government it was in the national interest to follow their example. Such active, well coordinated deep integration outside Sweden was only seen in Finland who embraced the EC into the roots of society (ibid, pp. 143–144).

Constructivist view on small states 
According to constructivists, the behavior of states is subject to change when the identities and interests of states change. That means that small states do not necessarily do what is practical, but can pursue ideational goals as well. Neumann and de Carvalho stated that small states primarily seek status and that small powers suffer from status insecurity to an extent that established great powers do not, which makes the status game even more important to them.

Smaller powers have status insecurity to an extent that established great powers do not have, therefore making the status game even more important to them. It is important to distinguish the status-seeking of smaller powers from greater powers. Smaller states have limited power resources and aiming for status can be the only possible choice. Small states' identities are constituted in relation to great powers and are therefore initially hierarchical.

Small and middle powers play a role in constituting great powers and the greater posers depend on non-great powers to acknowledge their greatness. International status seeking cannot be separated from domestic legitimation, especially with small states that are integrated in global politics. Smaller states' status aim is often to stand in one or more peer groups of similar states. They might also seek recognition by great powers as useful allies, contributors to systems maintenance or as impartial arbiters. Smaller states do not seek status by seeking to match greater powers materially. Some degree of emulation can however pay off. States can be a major donor in the United Nations and give competitive status among peer groups of small states while simultaneously acknowledge great powers for system maintenance. Small states can get access to the middle power club since this is a category with loose membership criteria, but access to the great power club is not possible. Small states may opt for a collective strategy of mobility into the middle power rank by taking on extended responsibilities for preserving international order.

List of small powers
The following is a list of countries that are described as being small powers:

See also
 Balance of power (international relations)

References

Types of countries